Rubrobacter bracarensis is a Gram-positive, spore-forming and aerobic bacterium from the genus of Rubrobacter which has been isolated from biofilm from the Vilar de Frades Church in Portugal.

References

External links 
Type strain of Rubrobacter bracarensis at BacDive –  the Bacterial Diversity Metadatabase

 

Rubrobacterales
Bacteria described in 2013